William Adams (30 September 1752 – 21 September 1811) was a British merchant and Tory politician.

He was the eldest son of William Adams of Totnes, Devon. He was made Mayor of Totnes for 1780–81, 1788–89 and 1797–98 and served as town Recorder from 1807 to 1811.

He was elected as the Member of Parliament (MP) for Plympton Erle in 1796. He resigned that seat to be elected MP for Totnes in Devon, his native town, at a by-election in June 1801, and was returned unopposed to the House of Commons at the next three general elections, holding the seat until his death in 1811 at the age of 58.

He married Anna Maria Dacres in 1774. She was a daughter of Richard Dacres of Leatherhead, Surrey and wet nurse to Princess Amelia, and by her he had two sons and two daughters. In 1810 he was living in Bowden House, Ashprington, near Totnes, which he had purchased from the Trist family in about 1800.

References

External links 

1752 births
1811 deaths
English merchants
UK MPs 1801–1802
UK MPs 1802–1806
UK MPs 1806–1807
UK MPs 1807–1812
Members of the Parliament of the United Kingdom for Totnes
Tory MPs (pre-1834)
Members of the Parliament of Great Britain for Plympton Erle
British MPs 1796–1800
Mayors of Totnes
Tory members of the Parliament of the United Kingdom